Stanislav Genchev (born 20 March 1981) is a Bulgarian former footballer and now manager, who is currently the manager of Lokomotiv Sofia.

Career

SC Vaslui

SC Vaslui signed Genchev as a free player, on 14 June 2008. Genchev signed a three-year contract. He scored in his first game for SC Vaslui, in a 2–1 defeat against Neftchi Baku, scoring with a 25 metres shot. He played as a defensive midfielder, central midfielder, right midfielder, central defender and as a right defender, having some great performances. On 4 August, against Omonia Nicosia, he played for 10 minutes, as a goalkeeper, after Kuciak was sent off.

Ludogorets Razgrad
Genchev featured regularly for Ludogorets and was an important player for the team during the 2011/2012 season. On 18 November 2012, he scored a brace against Levski Sofia to help his team to a 2–1 win and enable it to reclaim the top spot in the A PFG table.

On 2 June 2017, Genchev announced his official retirement as player.

International career
In March 2008, the Bulgarian national coach Plamen Markov called up Stanislav Genchev to Bulgaria national football team for a friendly match with Finland. On 26 March 2008, Genchev made his debut for Bulgaria. He played for 25 minutes and scored the winning goal in the 90th minute. The result of the match was 2–1 in favour of Bulgaria. Genchev's last call-up to the national team was in October 2011 (under caretaker manager Mihail Madanski) for a Euro 2012 qualifier against Wales.

Managerial statistics

Career statistics

Club

International goal
Scores and results list Bulgaria's goal tally first.

Honours
Levski Sofia
 Bulgarian A Football Group: 2001–02 
 Bulgarian Cup: 2001–02, 2002–03, 2004–05

Ludogorets Razgrad
 Bulgarian A Football Group: 2011–12, 2012–13
 Bulgarian Cup: 2011–12

Litex Lovech
 Bulgarian Cup: 2007–08

Etar
 Bulgarian Second League: 2016–17

FC Vaslui
 UEFA Intertoto Cup: 2008

Individual
 FC Vaslui Player of the Season: 2008–09

References

External links
 Profile at LevskiSofia.info

1981 births
Living people
People from Dryanovo
Association football midfielders
Bulgarian footballers
Bulgaria international footballers
Bulgarian expatriate footballers
PFC Levski Sofia players
PFC Spartak Varna players
PFC Velbazhd Kyustendil players
PFC Cherno More Varna players
PFC Litex Lovech players
FC Vaslui players
PFC Ludogorets Razgrad players
AEL Limassol players
PFC Slavia Sofia players
FC Montana players
SFC Etar Veliko Tarnovo players
Expatriate footballers in Romania
Bulgarian expatriate sportspeople in Romania
Expatriate footballers in Cyprus
First Professional Football League (Bulgaria) players
Second Professional Football League (Bulgaria) players
Liga I players
Cypriot First Division players
Bulgarian football managers
PFC Ludogorets Razgrad managers